The Staats House is a historic building located along the Hudson River near Stockport, Columbia County, New York. The first house at this site was burned and rebuilt on the original foundation .

The house was constructed by Abraham Staats circa 1652–1665 with stone walls which are three feet thick. Native American Indians burned the house and killed the original tenant and abducted his wife, but the structure was rebuilt. The house was built on the site where Henry Hudson purportedly landed in 1609.

See also
 List of the oldest buildings in New York

References

External links
 
 

 

Houses in New York (state)
Historic American Buildings Survey in New York (state)